Nenad Maslovar (born 20 February 1967) is a Montenegrin retired football player. He is currently president of Montenegrin Second League team OFK Grbalj.

Club career
Born in Kotor, SR Montenegro, SFR Yugoslavia, he made his debut as senior with FK Bokelj during the 1986/87 season of the Yugoslav Second League.  He continued his career in Yugoslav First League clubs FK Spartak Subotica and FK Velež Mostar reaching his highlight during the 1990s when he played with Red Star Belgrade becoming in that period a national team player. His last six years of his career he spent in Japan.

International career
Maslovar made his debut for FR Yugoslavia on 12 June 1997, in a friendly match against Ghana at a Korean tournament and has earned a total of 3 caps, scoring no goals. His final international was four days later against hosts South Korea.

Personal life
He was elected president of OFK Grbalj in November 2018.

Club statistics

References

External links

 Profile at Serbian federation official site

1967 births
Living people
People from Kotor
Association football midfielders
Yugoslav footballers
Montenegrin footballers
Serbia and Montenegro footballers
Serbia and Montenegro international footballers
FK Bokelj players
FK Spartak Subotica players
FK Velež Mostar players
Red Star Belgrade footballers
JEF United Chiba players
Avispa Fukuoka players
Yugoslav Second League players
Yugoslav First League players
First League of Serbia and Montenegro players
J1 League players
Serbia and Montenegro expatriate footballers
Expatriate footballers in Japan
Serbia and Montenegro expatriate sportspeople in Japan
Montenegrin football managers
OFK Grbalj managers